MaX, also known as Madrid_linux is a linux distribution created with funds from the Conserjería de Educación, Juventud y Deporte of the Comunidad de Madrid adapted for use in educational environments. The main features of this operating system are simplicity, stability and a huge collection of software.

History

Start
MaX started out simply as an educational distribution made for lower performance computers, since most of the computers in the schools of the Comunidad de Madrid had only 32 bits and very little RAM, so they had problems with the main operating systems. Later, more members were joining the ''Max Group" and were receiving suggestions for improvements, additions. In 2013 they already had 60 members, including professors of all kinds.

Desktop and Support
During the first versions of MaX it was used with the KDE desktop environment and only supported 32-bit computers of the i486 architecture, until MaX version 3, where the processor architecture was changed to i386, also 32-bit. In MaX version 4, the desktop environment was changed to GNOME, one of the most widely used in Linux, and in version 5 support for 64-bit computers with x86_64 architecture was added. In version 7, the desktop environment was changed to Xfce. In version 9 the desktop environment was changed again to Mate, and in version 11 support for 32-bit computers ended.

Activities performed
The MaX team has participated in events of schools, such as 'Program-me at IES Clara del Rey, with the purpose of supporting new talents; or with IES Príncipe Felipe at MediaLab Prado, to encourage diffusion of MaX.

Conferences
MaX has held many conferences over the years, almost annually, to present future versions of MaX, create workshops, or hold install parties. The conference was held online in 2021.

Characteristics

Community
The community of users actively participates, testing the system, reporting problems, contributing with improvement proposals, helping other users or sharing with their peers the benefits of using this system. In return, MAX will work better and better, it will adapt better to the real needs of the teachers and the students.

MaX has its own community forum and a volunteer development group.

Included software
MaX has learning software such as Scratch and Moodle.

Launch and support

MaX 9
MaX 9 was released on February 7, 2017, changing its desktop environment for the third time, in this case to Ubuntu Mate (16.04). Not many other changes have been made to the desktop, but there is a noticeable difference in the taskbar.

MaX 10
The MaX 10 release, based on Ubuntu Mate|Ubuntu Mate (18.04), was released on October 26, 2018. In this version the operating system performance has been greatly improved, although the minimum requirements have been increased compared to the previous build.

MaX 11
MaX 11 release was launched on July 20, 2021. with the main purpose of making a redesign to the operating system. Added a Mac style dock at the bottom of the desktop with the most relevant applications, moved the position of the taskbar to the top of the screen, the wallpaper and icons have been redesigned, indicators have been added for NumLock and ShiftLock, and two new menus called Education/STEM and Distance Education have been added.

Added the programs programs Scratux, MuseScore3, Kdenlive, OBS, Xournal++, Phet, Step, eXeLearning 2.6. This version is only compatible with modern computers, as it no longer supports 32-bit computers, and its minimum requirements have been raised.

See also
Portal:Linux
Ubuntu based distributions

References

External links

MaX Webpage

Educational operating systems
Spanish-language Linux distributions
State-sponsored Linux distributions
Ubuntu derivatives
Linux distributions